Pushing is a village and jamoat in Tajikistan. It is located in Danghara District in Khatlon Region. The jamoat has a total population of 13,293 (2015).

Notes

References

Populated places in Khatlon Region
Jamoats of Tajikistan